"Crying in the Club" is the debut solo single recorded by Cuban-born American singer Camila Cabello, released on May 19, 2017. It was written by Cabello, Sia, Benny Blanco and Happy Perez, with production handled by Blanco, Perez and Cashmere Cat. The song contains an interpolation of Christina Aguilera's 1999 single "Genie in a Bottle". A mid-tempo tropical pop and dance track, it was originally intended to be the lead single from Cabello's debut studio album, which was originally titled The Hurting. The Healing. The Loving. It was later removed from the track listing and featured on Side A of the 7-inch eponymous extended play released on July 14, 2017. The song reached number three in Bulgaria, as well as the top forty in eleven additional countries. "Crying in the Club" is certified Platinum in the United States, United Kingdom, Canada, Australia, and Italy. It is Cabello's first completely solo single since her departure from American girl group Fifth Harmony.

Background and release
Cabello previously collaborated with producers Benny Blanco and Cashmere Cat on the latter's song "Love Incredible", recorded in May 2016. Following Cabello's departure from the girl group Fifth Harmony, and after years of writing in her downtime, she began writing songs in earnest for her debut. In November 2016, during a writing session with Blanco, singer-songwriter Sia conceived the concept for a demo, and both composed the song. After Blanco offered her "Crying in the Club", Cabello rewrote the song's bridge and recorded the track. "It had a message about healing through the power of music," she said later, "That theme was a key part of what I wanted for my album."

The song was released on May 19, 2017, to digital music stores and streaming services, following several music collaborations by Cabello, including "Bad Things" with Machine Gun Kelly–which reached the top 10 on several Billboard charts. "Crying in the Club" was serviced to US contemporary hit radio on May 23, 2017. It was later featured on the Side A of the 7-inch eponymous extended play released on July 14, 2017.

Composition and lyrical interpretation

"Crying in the Club" is a mid-tempo pop and dance track featuring a "subdued" minor-key dance groove and dancehall-inspired beat. Some critics described it as a tropical track. Lyrically, the song contains themes of the healing powers of music and dancing your heartbreak away. The song interpolates Christina Aguilera's "Genie in a Bottle", written by David Frank, Steve Kipner and Pamela Sheyne. The song is written in the key of F minor, with Cabello's vocals spanning from the low note of E3 to the high belted note of F5. Sia performed backing vocals for the song.

Critical reception
Writing for Billboard, Joe Lynch opined the song "demonstrates just enough vocal flair for the former Fifth Harmony star to escape the more generic tropes of top 40," while in Rolling Stone, Ryan Reed noted Cabello "finds emotional redemption" in the song. Editors from Rap-Up wrote "the song blends island flavors with intense pop sounds, making it a dance-ready soundtrack for optimism." Anna Gaca of Spin described the song as a "dancehall-inspired beat that bears a passing resemblance to Sia's 'Cheap Thrills'." Idolator writer Mike Wass called the song a "moody, mid-tempo bop", and opined, "the 20-year-old followed Sia's demo a little too closely. She's almost unrecognizable and that's worrying for something trying to establish their independence."

Year-end lists

Music video
Directed by Emil Nava, the song's accompanying music video was released on May 19, 2017. The clip opens in black and white with Cabello standing against a brick wall, dancing through the fog and soaking in a tub as she performs the song "I Have Questions", before transitioning into the song itself with the singer dancing in a crowded club. The video has received positive reviews. Writing for Billboard, Gil Kaufman related the concept to Dr Jekyll and Mr Hyde. In Rolling Stone, Ryan Reed opined the video "mirrors the song's emotional journey. It opens with black-and-white shots of the singer crying and reclining in a bathtub before exploding with color in the nightclub." As of June 2021, the video has surpassed over 200 million views.

Live performances
Cabello performed the song live for the first time at the 2017 Billboard Music Awards on May 21. The singer started her performance by singing "I Have Questions" before transitioning into "Crying in the Club". Wearing sparkly gold attire, Cabello danced amid male backup dancers and drummers as fires burned behind them. The singer also performed the song on Britain's Got Talent on May 31, and at the 2017 iHeartRadio Much Music Video Awards on June 18. Cabello delivered a "stripped-back" acoustic rendition on The Tonight Show Starring Jimmy Fallon on June 22. Idolator's Mike Wass considered it "her best live performance yet."

She also included the song as a part of her setlist as an opening act on Bruno Mars' 24K Magic World Tour.

Cover versions
Niall Horan performed the song as a pop-rock jam on guitar for his Flicker World Tour in Killarney, Ireland. Cabello shared a fan-filmed video of his live cover on Twitter while expressing her appreciation. It was nominated by iHeartRadio Music Awards in 2019 for Best Cover Song.

Accolade

Formats and track listings

Crying in the Club (7-inch EP)

Charts

Weekly charts

Year-end charts

Certifications

Release history

References

External links

2017 songs
Camila Cabello songs
Dancehall songs
Songs written by Camila Cabello
Songs written by Sia (musician)
Songs written by Benny Blanco
Songs written by Cashmere Cat
Songs written by David Frank (musician)
Songs written by Steve Kipner
Songs written by Pam Sheyne
Song recordings produced by Benny Blanco
Song recordings produced by Cashmere Cat
Epic Records singles
Torch songs
Tropical songs
Songs about dancing
Songs about nightclubs